The San Francisco Board of Supervisors is the legislative body of San Francisco, California, United States. The body consists of eleven members elected from single-member districts through ranked choice voting.

From 1977 to 1979, and starting again in 2000, supervisors were elected from eleven single-member districts. Prior to 1977 and from 1980 to 1998, members were elected at-large, all running on one ballot, with the top vote-getters winning office. In 1980, elections shifted from odd-numbered years to even-numbered years, and because of the shift from district to at-large elections, all seats were up for election, with some members winning four-year terms and some winning two-year terms. Similar cases of supervisors elected to truncated terms happened in 1977 and 2000, when elections shifted to district elections.

Several members were initially appointed by the mayor. San Francisco's city charter gives the mayor the power to fill any vacancies and to suspend members in limited circumstances; the latter case has happened only once, when Mayor Gavin Newsom suspended Ed Jew due to allegations of lying about his residency and extortion. A few members were elected to the board, but appointed to their seat by the mayor during the weeks between the election and the beginning of their term. This has generally been done when supervisors were elected to the state legislature, since the terms of state legislators begin earlier than those of supervisors. The most recent example occurred in 2008, when David Campos was elected to the District 9 seat held by Tom Ammiano. In the same election, Ammiano was elected to the California State Assembly and resigned his seat a month early to take his new office. Mayor Gavin Newsom appointed Campos to the seat on December 4, 2008, a month before he would otherwise have taken office.

Board presidents

The president of the Board of Supervisors presides over all board meetings and appoints members to board committees, among other duties. Board presidents are elected by their colleagues at the beginning of every odd-numbered year, or when a vacancy arises in the office. From 1983 to 2001, the city charter specified that the president would be the highest vote-getter in the previous election, taking the power of electing the board president away from the supervisors themselves, except in the case of a vacancy in the post.

Board members 
No official list of supervisors in office prior to 1906 exists as the 1906 San Francisco earthquake destroyed all Board of Supervisors records. However, the names of San Francisco supervisors are recorded in many documents and newspapers from the time.

San Francisco Common Council 
The San Francisco Common Council was the predecessor of the San Francisco Board of Supervisors. The Common Council was made up of the Board of Aldermen and the Board of Assistant Aldermen, each composed of one member elected from each of the city's eight wards. The first elections to these posts took place on May 1, 1850 (the same day as the vote on the city charter), and the Common Council took office on May 6, 1850. The Common Council had authority only within the city limits, which stretched west to Divisadero and Castro streets and south to 20th Street.

The seventh and last Common Council served until July 1856, when under the Consolidation Act that unified city and county government in San Francisco, the Common Council was replaced by the first Board of Supervisors.

Four-member board (July–November 1856) 
The first Board of Supervisors served only from July 8 to November 15, 1856, and consisted of one justice of the peace for each of the city's four districts. These four men chose George J. Whelan as the city's mayor and president of the board.

12 members elected by district (1856–1899) 
Supervisors from the 19th century are listed in surviving copies of municipal reports, contemporary newspapers, and similar sources.

 Charles W. Bond resigned April 7, 1858.
 Thomas Tennett took his seat May 21, 1858.
 A.G. Randall resigned February 13, 1860.
 John C. Ayres took his seat May 7, 1860.
 John Lynch resigned October 7, 1861.
 James W. Cudworth took his seat November 4, 1861.
 James Otis resigned November 25, 1861, "as he is under the necessity of absenting himself from the State for the next few months".
 J.H. Redington took his seat December 30, 1861.

18 members elected at-large, serving two-year terms (1900–1911) 
Article II, Chapter I, Section 2 of the revised charter, ratified by voters on May 26, 1898, specified that "[t]he Board of Supervisors shall consist of eighteen members all of whom shall hold office for two years and be elected from the City and County at large." Former mayors of the city were allowed non-voting seats on the board. In 1912, supervisors' terms were extended to four years.

 A.B. Maguire resigned some time before June 27, 1900 and died shortly afterwards.
 Samuel Braunhart was appointed June 27, 1900 to replace A.B Maguire.
 John E.A. Helms died some time before July 26, 1900, while returning from a trip to investigate the possibility of using Lake Tahoe as a water supply for the city.
 Colonel Victor Donglain Duboce, a veteran of the Spanish–American War died some time before August 15, 1900.
 Henry J. Stafford was appointed November 1, 1900 to replace John E.A. Helms.
 Horace Wilson was appointed November 1, 1900 to replace Victor D. Duboce.
 L.J. Dwyer died some time before February 8, 1902.
 Robert J. Loughery was appointed February 8, 1902 to replace L.J. Dwyer.
 William J. Wynn resigned after his election as U.S. Representative for California's 5th congressional district for the term beginning March 4, 1903.
 Edward I. Walsh was appointed March 4, 1903 to replace W.J. Wynn.
 Thomas F. Finn resigned January 1, 1905.
 James L. Gallagher was appointed February 11, 1905 to replace Thomas F. Finn. On June 17, 1907, Gallagher was appointed acting mayor by the board of supervisors, to serve in place of Eugene E. Schmitz, who had been arrested on felony charges of extortion. Schmitz protested his removal, but Gallagher continued to serve until the board elected Charles Boxton to fill Schmitz's unexpired term on July 9, 1907.
 A.M. Wilson and G.F. Duffey resigned their positions prior to January 17, 1907; Wilson took up the position of state railroad commissioner; Duffey became director of the city's department of public works.
 J.J. O'Neill and O.A. Tveitmoe were appointed by Mayor Eugene E. Schmitz on January 17, 1907 to succeed A.M. Wilson and G.F. Duffey, who had resigned.
 On March 18, 1907, as part of the San Francisco graft trials, 16 of the 18 supervisors confessed before a grand jury to receiving money from corrupt political boss Abe Ruef. In exchange for their testimony, "they were promised complete immunity and would not be forced to resign their offices."
 Following the conviction of Mayor Eugene E. Schmitz for extortion, the board declared the office of the mayor vacant on July 9, 1907. Charles Boxton resigned his position as supervisor the same day and was elected by the board to fill Schmitz's unexpired term. However, testimony in Schmitz's corruption trial soon revealed that Boxton had taken bribes, so he actually served only seven days as mayor, resigning on July 16, 1907 to be replaced by Edward R. Taylor, dean of Hastings College of the Law. On July 29, 1907, Taylor appointed James P. Booth, who had served as a supervisor from 1900 to 1905, to serve Boxton's unexpired term as supervisor.
 On July 29, 1907, two weeks after Edward R. Taylor's appointment as mayor, he conducted a wholesale purge of supervisors connected with the graft scandal. Taylor obtained the resignations of 14 supervisors and appointed replacements for all their seats plus the open seat created by the resignation of Charles Boxton. These 15 appointments were protested by supervisors O.A. Tveitmoe and J.J. O'Neill, who had not resigned, on the grounds that Taylor's claim to the mayor's office had not been legally established. On August 26, 1907, P.M. McGushin resigned and Taylor replaced him with former supervisor A. Comte, Jr.
 Lippmann Sachs and W.G. Stafford were both elected in November 1907 to continue as supervisors. However, both resigned before May 28, 1908.
 George A. Connolly and A.A. D'Ancona were appointed as supervisors on May 28, 1908 to replace W.G. Stafford and Lippmann Sachs, respectively.
 William W. Sanderson was appointed June 1, 1909 to replace A.H. Giannini, who had resigned. Attilio Henry Giannini was the brother of A.P. Giannini, founder of the Bank of America. W.W. Sanderson was a grocery executive with Hooper & Jennings. He served as a supervisor during the period of Abe Ruef's corruption, and gave evidence about the graft schemes.
 W.E. Balcom was appointed June 7, 1909 to replace L.P. Rixford, who had resigned.
 John I. Nolan was appointed March 6, 1911 to replace John P. McLaughlin, who had resigned.

18 members elected at-large, serving staggered four-year terms (1912–1931) 
From January 8, 1912, the term of office of San Francisco supervisors was extended to four years, with nine members elected every two years. The nine supervisors with the highest vote counts at the 1911 election received four-year terms, and the other nine received two-year initial terms putting them up for re-election in 1913.

 Four members elected to four-year seats in 1912 served on the previous board: Paul Bancroft, James Emmet Hayden, Oscar Hocks and Charles Albert Murdock.
 A.H. Giannini was appointed January 8, 1912 to replace J.B. Bocarde who was elected in November 1911 but died before his term started.
 John C. Kortick was appointed March 9, 1914 to replace George E. Gallagher who resigned January 8, 1914.
 Edward I. "Eddie" Wolfe collapsed and died while speaking at a luncheon on January 26, 1922. The next day Mayor James Rolph appointed Jesse C. Colman to the vacant seat.
 The November 6, 1917 election used a preferential system for the supervisor race, apparently using the Bucklin voting system. Voters cast ballots for first, second and third choices for nine supervisor positions, choosing among 49 candidates. The total votes cast were divided by the nine seats to calculate a majority threshold. Ralph McLeran got most votes and was elected based on first preference votes only; Charles Nelson was elected based on first and second preference votes; the other seven successful candidates required first, second and third preference votes.
 Mary Margaret Morgan was the first woman elected as a San Francisco supervisor. She placed seventh of 22 candidates for the nine seats at stake in the November 8, 1921 election.
 Milton Marks, Sr. was the father of Milton Marks, Jr. who became the state assembly member and later state senator representing San Francisco. Milton Marks, Sr. did not stand for re-election in November 1929.
 A.J. Rossi was sworn in as mayor of San Francisco on January 7, 1931 to fill the vacancy left by the swearing in of James Rolph as governor of California the previous day. Rossi had been chosen for the post on January 5 by a 14–2 vote of the Board of Supervisors. At the same time Dr. Joseph M. Toner took up a position as director of institutions for California. On January 20, Rossi's appointees Samuel T. Breyer and Thomas P. Garrity were sworn in to fill the two open supervisor seats.
 Samuel T. Breyer was the father of Irving Breyer, who later served as legal counsel for the San Francisco Board of Education, and the grandfather of U.S. Supreme Court Justice Stephen Breyer and U.S. District Judge Charles Breyer.

15 members elected at-large (1932–1933) 
The new city charter adopted by voters in November 1931 reduced the Board of Supervisors' membership in two stages from 18 members to 11. The first stage was that the nine members whose terms expired at the end of 1931 were replaced by six new members elected in November 1931. This reduced the board to 15 members for the period 1932–1933. Then, at the 1933 election, only five supervisors were elected, reducing the board to 11 members. The 1931 charter also removed administrative responsibility from the board and restricted it to a legislative role, and it created a new position of President of the Board of Supervisors. Previously, the mayor had served as president of the board.

11 members elected at-large (1934–1977)

11 members elected by district (1978–1980)

11 members elected at-large (1981–2000)

11 members elected by district (2001–present)

Timeline of supervisors since 2000
This graphical timeline depicts the composition of the San Francisco Board of Supervisors since district elections were resumed in November 2000, along with the mayor in office at each point. Each color corresponds to one of the city's 11 districts, with a paler shade indicating periods when the officeholder was appointed rather than elected.

Board members and transitions since 1980 

Current members shaded in yellow. Members who served as president of the Board of Supervisors during part of their tenure on the board are denoted with an asterisk (*).

Nonpartisanship 
Supervisors are elected on non-partisan ballots, but all current members of the Board of Supervisors are registered Democrats. Supervisor Jane Kim was previously a member of the Green Party, but switched her registration to Democratic before running for supervisor.

References

Sources

External links

 San Francisco Board of Supervisors official website
 Past members of the Board of Supervisors

 
Articles which contain graphical timelines